Longmont is a home rule municipality located in Boulder and Weld counties, Colorado, United States.

Longmont's population was 98,885 as of the 2020 U.S. Census.

Longmont is named after Longs Peak, a prominent mountain named for explorer Stephen H. Long that is clearly visible from Longmont, and "mont", from the French word "montagne" for mountain.

History
Longmont was founded in 1871 by a group of people from Chicago, Illinois. Originally called the Chicago-Colorado Colony, led by president Robert Collyer, the men sold memberships in the town, purchasing the land necessary for the town hall with the proceeds. As the first planned community in Boulder County, the city streets were laid out in a grid plan within a square mile. The city began to flourish as an agricultural community after the Colorado Central Railroad line arrived northward from Boulder in 1877. During the 1940s, Longmont began to grow beyond these original limits.

In 1925, the Ku Klux Klan gained control of Longmont 's City Council in an election. They began construction of a large pork-barrel project, Chimney Rock Dam, above Lyons and marched up and down Main Street in their costumes. In the 1927 election they were voted out of office, and their influence soon declined. Work on Chimney Rock Dam was abandoned as unfeasible, and its foundations are still visible in the St. Vrain River.

In 1955, United Airlines Flight 629 exploded over Longmont, killing 44 passengers and crew.

During the 1960s, the federal government built the Denver Air Route Traffic Control Center in Longmont, and IBM built a manufacturing and development campus near Longmont. As agriculture waned, more high technology has come to the city, including companies like Seagate and Amgen; Amgen closed its Longmont campus in 2015. In April 2009, the GE Energy Company relocated its control solutions business to the area.

The downtown along Main Street, once nearly dead during the 1980s, has seen a vibrant revival in the 1990s and into the 21st century. During the mid-1990s, the southern edge of Longmont became the location of the first New Urbanist project in Colorado, called Prospect New Town, designed by the architects Andrés Duany and Elizabeth Plater-Zyberk.

Longmont was the site of Colorado's first library, founded in 1871 by Elizabeth Rowell Thompson, though it lasted up to a year before its collection of 300 books was lost. Following this, Longmont also was the site of one of Carnegie's libraries with the single-story structure being opened in 1913. It remained open until August 7, 1972 when, due to overcrowding with approximately 22,000 books within the space, it was closed just a week before the new library that had been constructed next door was opened.

In May 2013, the Longmont City Council voted to finance and build out its own municipal gigabit data fiber-optic network, known as NextLight, to every house and business over a three-year period starting in late 2013.

Further information on Longmont's history, see The Official City of Longmont History and the Longmont Museum & Cultural Center.

Geography
The city extends eastward into western Weld County. U.S. Highway 287 (Main Street) runs through the center of the city, leading north  to Loveland and south  to downtown Denver. State Highway 119 passes through the city south of downtown and leads southwest  to Boulder and east  to Interstate 25.

St. Vrain Creek, a tributary of the South Platte River, flows through the city just south of the city center.

Climate

According to the Köppen Climate Classification system, Longmont has a cold semi-arid climate, abbreviated "Bsk" on climate maps.

Demographics

As of the census of 2010, there were 86,270 people living in the city (2019 estimate: 97,261). The population density was 3,294 people per square mile. There were 35,008 housing units. The racial makeup of the city was:
 83.3% White
 0.9% African American
 1.0% Native American
 3.2% Asian
 0.1% Pacific Islander
 8.6% from other races
 2.9% from two or more races.
 Hispanic or Latino of any race were 24.6% of the population.

There were 33,551 households, of which 36.9% had children under the age of 18 living with them, 54.6% were married couples living together, 10.1% had a female householder with no husband present, and 30.8% were non-families. 23.7% of all households were made up of individuals, and 7.3% had someone living alone who was 65 years of age or older. The average household size was 2.64 and the average family size was 3.15.

In the city, the population was spread out, with 28.6% under the age of 20, 6.3% from 20 to 24, 27.6% from 25 to 44, 26.2% from 45 to 64, and 11.1% who were 65 years of age or older. The median age was 36 years.

The median income for a household in the city was $58,698, and the median income for a family was $70,864. Males had a median income of $51,993 versus $41,025 for females. The per capita income for the city was $29,209. About 11.1% of families and 14.7% of the population were below the poverty line, including 21.4% of those under age 18 and 8.2% of those age 65 or over.

In 2011 Longmont was rated the 2nd safest city in Colorado.

Education
Longmont is home to the Boulder County Campus of Front Range Community College, the St. Vrain Valley School District, and to a number of private schools. Longmont is also home to the Master Instructor Continuing Education Program (MICEP) a voluntary accreditation program for aviation educators.

There is also a municipal public library.  there was deliberation over whether to establish a library district and to have the library publish news. That year the library's director stated, in the words of Corey Hutchins of the Columbia Journalism Review, "lacks resources and hasn’t kept up with the city’s growth".

Transportation
Longmont is part of the RTD transit district that provides local and regional bus service to Denver and Boulder.

Outside of RTD, Longmont is connected to Fort Collins, Loveland, and Berthoud via a FLEX regional bus service.

In 2012, Longmont was recognized by the League of American Bicyclists as a silver-level bicycle-friendly community. Longmont is one of 38 communities in the United States to be recognized with this distinction. It is the only city in Colorado placed at the silver level that is not a major tourist center or a university city.

Vance Brand Airport is a public-use airport owned by the city. It currently has no scheduled passenger flights, but it is popular for general aviation.

Media

The Longmont Leader (formerly the Longmont Observer) is the local daily newspaper.

The Longmont Times-Call, while bearing the city's name, is published from Boulder and is operated by Alden Global Capital of New York City.

Longmont's radio stations include KRCN, KGUD, and KKFN. Also located nearby is KDFD, a Fox News Radio affiliate with a conservative talk format.

NPR programming can be heard on Colorado Public Radio stations KCFR from Denver, and KCFC (AM) in Boulder. The NPR affiliate KUNC from the Fort Collins-Greeley market can also be heard in Longmont.

Longmont is also served by Pacifica Radio affiliate KGNU, a non-commercial community radio station from Boulder.

Economy

According to the City's 2020 Annual Comprehensive Financial Report, the top employers in the city are:

In addition, Longmont supports a thriving craft brewing industry as well as many recreational and travel-related businesses. Local breweries include two of the nation's largest craft brewers, Left Hand and Oskar Blues, as well as many others. To service the transportation needs of brewery patrons, the local Brew Hop Trolley offers a hop-on-hop-off brewery tour for a fixed price. Longmont is known for its 'maker' community. Longmont also features a Saturday Farmers Market.

Due to its proximity to the Rocky Mountain National Park, Longmont is home to many hotels, restaurants, and other businesses that cater in part to the tourists visiting the park each year. One recreational business that calls Longmont home is Mile Hi Skydiving, which is one of the largest skydiving facilities in the state of Colorado. Longmont is also home to Saul, the World's Largest Sticker Ball at StickerGiant, a custom sticker and label printing company on the city's east side. Other businesses support skiing and other snowsports, bicycling, and rock climbing.

Government
This is a list of mayors of Longmont.

Fire department
The Longmont Fire Department was established in its current form in 1908. The history of the department can be traced back to the creation of the W. A. Buckingham Hook & Ladder Company in 1879. 

 the department operates from six stations throughout the city. Longmont Fire Department Station 1 was built in 1907, used by the department until 1971, and listed in National Register of Historic Places in 1985.

Notable people
 Valarie Allman, Discus Gold Medalist in the 2020 Tokyo, Japan Olympics
Greg Biekert, American football player and coach (played football for Longmont High School)
 David Bote, baseball player
 Vance D. Brand, former astronaut
 Elizabeth A. Fenn, Pulitzer Prize winning historian, author of Encounters at the Heart of the World: A History of the Mandan People (lives in Longmont).
 John R. Kelso, congressman and author (lived and died in Longmont)
 Kody Lostroh, 2009 Professional Bull Riders World Champion
 Mr. Money Mustache, financial blogger
 David Pauley, baseball pitcher
 Jack Reynor, Irish actor, born in Longmont 
 Kristen Schaal, comedian and actress, grew up in Longmont
 Dan Simmons, author (1990 Hugo Award winner)
 Kimiko Soldati, diver, she competed at the 2004 Summer Olympics, born in Longmont
 Fred Stone, stage and film actor 
 William Oxley Thompson, president of Miami University of Ohio, president of Ohio State University
 Ed Werder, ESPN television commentator (born in Longmont)

Sister cities
Longmont has established a sister city relationship with:
  Chino, Nagano, Japan
  Ciudad Guzmán, Jalisco, Mexico
 Northern Arapaho Tribe, Wind River Reservation, Wyoming

See also

Outline of Colorado
Index of Colorado-related articles
State of Colorado
Colorado cities and towns
Colorado municipalities
Colorado counties
Boulder County, Colorado
Weld County, Colorado
List of statistical areas in Colorado
Front Range Urban Corridor
North Central Colorado Urban Area
Denver-Aurora-Boulder, CO Combined Statistical Area
Boulder, CO Metropolitan Statistical Area
Greeley, CO Metropolitan Statistical Area
Chivington Drive: the council took the decision to rename the city street following two decades of protests that it honored the soldier who was responsible for the Sand Creek Massacre of 1864.

References

External links
City of Longmont official website
 CDOT map of the City of Longmont
 History of Longmont
 Longmont Times-Call
 Longmont Channel 8 (public-access television station)

 
Cities in Boulder County, Colorado
Cities in Weld County, Colorado
Cities in Colorado
1871 establishments in Colorado Territory
Populated places established in 1871